Electric Lady may refer to:

 Electric Lady Studios, a recording studio opened by Jimi Hendrix
 Electric Lady (album), by Elkie Brooks, 2005
 Electric Lady, a 1985 album by Con Funk Shun
 The Electric Lady, a 2013 album by Janelle Monaé
 "Electric Lady" (song), the album's title track
 "Electric Lady", a song by Tesla Boy from Modern Thrills

See also
Electric Ladyland, an album by the Jimi Hendrix Experience
Electric Landlady, an album by Kirsty MacColl